Laberinto de Amor is the fifteenth (15th) studio album by Puerto Rican singer Yolandita Monge. It was released in 1987 and it includes the hits "Laberinto", "Eres Mágico", "Ahora, Ahora", and "Contigo". This album received a nomination for a Grammy Award for Best Latin Pop Album, marking the first time a female artist from Puerto Rico earned a Grammy nomination, a recognition she shares with fellow female artist Lunna for that same year.

This album follows the same musical arrangements and compositions of her previous productions, being her third and last release produced by the spanish team of Mariano Pérez & Oscar Gómez (CRAB).  Monge co-translated to the Spanish the italian song "Ahora, Ahora" and performed a Spanish version of the standard "On My Own" from the Broadway musical "Les Miserables".  This release was a big hit for Monge while earning Gold and Platinum status in sales.

This album is out of print in all formats.  Several hits songs appear in various compilations of the singer available as digital downloads at iTunes and Amazon.

Track listing

Credits and personnel

Vocals: Yolandita Monge
Producer: Mariano Pérez Bautista
Executive Producer: Sergio Rozenblat
Arrangements: Carlos Gómez, Javier Lozada
Drums: Mariano Rico, Antonio Moreno
Bass: Eduardo Gracia, Manolo Toro
Guitar: Pepe Marchante
Acoustic Guitar: Miguel Inesta
Pianos: Carlos Gómez, Javier Lozada
Synthesizers: Javier Lozada, Carlos Gómez, Bob Painter
Sax: Manolo Morales
Percussion: Henry Díaz
Flugelhorn: José Medrano

Chorus: María Lar, Maisa Keiser, José Flacón, Pelanganas, Janda Lándara, Sara Guinde
Engineer: Bob Painter
Assistant: Fernando Mingo, Jorge Gómez García
Make-up: Sixto Nolasco
Photography: José Manuel
Design: Piatti/Richardson Design Associates, Inc.
Personal Management: Artist Performers - Lynn Santiago

Notes

Track listing and credits from album cover.
Released in Cassette Format on 1987 (DIC-10482).
Released in CD Format on 1987 (CDDi-10482).

Charts

Singles charts

References

Yolandita Monge albums
1980 albums